Civic heraldry is heraldry used by municipalities.

Cities, towns, boroughs and other civic bodies often use heraldic arms as symbols for themselves and their authority. The traditions differ somewhat from one country to the other, but some similarities can be seen which distinguish all civic heraldry from state or personal heraldry. The most prominent common element is the mural crown, which is used as a sign for a city and its authority in many countries.

See also
Cornish corporate heraldry

References

External links 
 Heraldry of the World

Heraldry
Municipal coats of arms